Maeve Plouffe (born 8 July 1999) is an Australian professional racing cyclist. She rode in the women's team pursuit event and the women's individual pursuit event at the 2020 UCI Track Cycling World Championships in Berlin, Germany. She was selected on the Australian women’s track endurance squad for the 2020 Summer Olympics. She was a member of the Women's pursuit team. The team consisting of Ashlee Ankudinoff, Georgia Baker, Annette Edmondson, Alexandra Manly, Maeve Plouffe finished fifth.

Early cycling career
Plouffe was introduced to track cycling by a South Australian Sports Institute talent identification program from a background of swimming and surf life saving. She exhibited an early aptitude for the road time trial, winning the event as an U17 in her first year competing at the Australian Junior Road National Championships and again as an U19 in the Oceania Road Cycling Championships. Maeve made her international debut in the 2017 UCI Junior Track Cycling World Championships.

Elite career
Plouffe made her international elite debut at nineteen years of age in the opening round of the 2018–19 UCI Track Cycling World Cup women's points race in Saint-Quentin-en-Yvelines, France. She represented Australia again at the UCI Track Cycling World Cup in Hong Kong, before returning to Australia to win three elite Australian Championship titles in the individual pursuit, team pursuit and madison. In the 2020 season Maeve Plouffe became Oceania champion in the scratch race and won two silver and two bronze medals. Only three months prior to the championships, she underwent an operation on her wrist as a result of a fall in a street race in Belgium. In the 2019–20 UCI Track Cycling World Cup season, Maeve’s team won a silver medal and set a new Australian record in the women’s team pursuit in Cambridge, New Zealand, before winning a gold medal in the women's team pursuit in Brisbane, Australia. Her performances gained her selection for the UCI Track World Championships in Berlin, where she placed fifth in the women’s team pursuit and tenth in the individual pursuit improving her personal best time by five seconds, clocking 3 minutes 26.742 seconds.

At the 2022 Commonwealth Games, Plouffe won the gold medal in the women's team pursuit event alongside Sophie Edwards, Chloe Moran and Georgia Baker, setting a games record time of 4:14.06.

Personal life
In 2020, Plouffe was studying a double degree in law and science, with double majors in marine biology and ecology at the University of Adelaide.

References

External links
 

1999 births
Living people
Australian female cyclists
Place of birth missing (living people)
Cyclists at the 2020 Summer Olympics
Olympic cyclists of Australia
20th-century Australian women
21st-century Australian women
Cyclists at the 2022 Commonwealth Games
Commonwealth Games gold medallists for Australia
Commonwealth Games silver medallists for Australia
Commonwealth Games medallists in cycling
Medallists at the 2022 Commonwealth Games